Outsana Dao (born 1 June 1960) is a Laotian boxer. He competed in the men's welterweight event at the 1980 Summer Olympics. At the 1980 Summer Olympics, he lost to Joseph Frost of Great Britain.

References

1960 births
Living people
Laotian male boxers
Olympic boxers of Laos
Boxers at the 1980 Summer Olympics
Place of birth missing (living people)
Welterweight boxers